Stephen Bent is an English actor who has appeared regularly on British television since 1970 in varied roles, including on 5 soaps, Crossroads, Coronation Street, EastEnders, Hollyoaks and Emmerdale. In 1989, he played the role of  Jackson in the television production Agatha Christie's Miss Marple: A Caribbean Mystery. He has also acted in theatre.

He appeared initially as a well-known face on British TV for his role as Gerry Hurst in the ATV tea-time soap opera Crossroads. Then as a recurring character in Hollyoaks as Don Trent. In 2013 he appeared as Micky Saunders in Truckers.

Filmography

References

External links

Stephen Bent at Diamond Management
Stephen Bent at Familiar Unknown

English male soap opera actors
Living people
Year of birth missing (living people)